Segarcea is a small town in Dolj County, Oltenia, Romania.

Situated in the east-central part of Dolj County, Segarcea belongs to the Craiova metropolitan area.

The town is famous for its white wines. The Segarcea vineyard belongs to the Romanian Crown Estate; it has gained fame for wines produced and exported to many countries of the world under the trade name "The Crown Domain".

Natives
Ștefan Grigorie
Vintilă Horia

References

Towns in Romania
Populated places in Dolj County
Localities in Oltenia